Silvana Neitzke (born 2 March 1971) is a Brazilian diver. She competed in the women's 10 metre platform event at the 1992 Summer Olympics.

References

External links
 

1971 births
Living people
Brazilian female divers
Olympic divers of Brazil
Divers at the 1992 Summer Olympics
Sportspeople from Minas Gerais
20th-century Brazilian women